Salvia maximowicziana is a perennial plant that is found growing on grasslands, forests, and forest edges in China, at  elevation. The upper leaf surface is nearly smooth, or lightly covered with hairs, while the underside has glandular hairs on the veins.

The inflorescence is of loose racemes or panicles, with a  corolla. Salvia maximowicziana var. maximowicziana has a yellow corolla, while Salvia maximowicziana var. floribunda has a purple corolla.

References

maximowicziana
Flora of China